The 2019 Tewkesbury Borough Council election took place on 7 May 2015 to elect members for the 20 wards of the Tewkesbury Borough Council in England. At the election, the Conservatives retained control of the council.

Summary

Election result

|-

Ward Results

Badgeworth

Brockworth East

Brockworth West

Churchdown Brookfield with Hucclecote

Churchdown St John's

Cleeve Grange

Cleeve Hill

Cleeve St Michael's

Cleeve West

Highnam with Haw Bridge

Innsworth

Isbourne

Northway

Severn Vale North

Severn Vale South

Shurdington

Tewkesbury East

Tewkesbury North and Twyning

Tewkesbury South

Winchcombe

By-elections

Cleeve Hill (May 2021)

Brockworth East (November 2021)

Brockworth East (April 2022)

References 

Tewkesbury
Tewkesbury Borough Council elections
May 2019 events in the United Kingdom
2010s in Gloucestershire